Daniel Jerry Andersson (born 28 August 1977) is a Swedish former professional footballer who is the director of sports at Malmö FF. He played primarily as a defensive midfielder but could also play as a centre back, which he mostly did later in his career. Andersson played the majority of his career for Malmö FF in two different periods where he also served as team captain between 2006 and 2011, he also had a successful period playing for Serie A club Bari. He also had a long international playing career, playing 74 matches for Sweden. Daniel is part of a prosperous football family as both his father Roy Andersson and brother Patrik Andersson had successful football careers.

Club career

Early career
Andersson played for Bjärreds IF as a youngster, but joined Malmö FF in 1994. He gradually became a star in the Swedish league, and was bought by Italian Serie A outfit Bari.

Bari
Andersson enjoyed big personal success at Bari, being named captain as a foreigner at only 23 years, in his third year. This attracted the interest of Juventus and Fiorentina amongst other clubs, with both clubs putting bids on the table. Andersson was also on his way to Fiorentina, but due to their financial problems the transfer was cancelled in the last minute.

Venezia and loans to Chievo and Ancona
Instead he transferred to Venezia for a fee of 6 million euro, where he had an average season. After that he had short loan stints with Chievo and Ancona. In 2004, he returned to Malmö FF together with former teammate Yksel Osmanovski.

Return to Malmö FF
Daniel Andersson returned to Malmö FF the same year as his brother, Patrik Andersson, who was captain of the team at the time. The return of both Andersson brothers was a contributing factor to the club winning the league the same year. When Patrik retired due to injury problems in 2005 Daniel took over the captaincy and held it until retirement.

After having played as centre midfielder for the majority of his career he took the position as centre back from the start of the 2010 season, where he enjoyed great success consistently being one of the best players in Malmö FF that year. By this change he became the third Andersson family member after his father Roy and brother Patrik to captain Malmö FF from the centre back position. He succeeded so well with the position change that he was nominated for Swedish defender of the year and Allsvenskan player of the year after he led Malmö FF to their 16th Swedish Championship.

On 29 October 2011, Andersson announced that he would focus on his forthcoming coaching career as one of the three assistant managers for Malmö FF but emphasized that he would continue to play for the club when he was needed. On 15 December 2011, he played his last match for Malmö FF as player only in the away match against Austria Wien in the final fixture of the group stage of the 2011–12 UEFA Europa League. Due to injury problems with the clubs younger defenders Andersson played 16 of 30 matches in the 2012 season, most of these matches were played before the summer break. His last match as a professional player was an away fixture against IF Elfsborg on 12 August 2012. On 16 November Andersson announced the end of his professional playing career to be able to fully focus on his coaching duties.

International career

Youth 
Andersson represented the Sweden U17, U19, and U21 teams between 1993 and 1998 and was part of the Sweden squad that reached the quarter-finals at the 1998 UEFA European Under-21 Championship.

Senior 
Andersson was capped 74 times for Sweden between 1997 and 2009. He was a squad member for Euro 2000, Euro 2008, and the 2002 and 2006 World Cup finals. At Euro 2000, he was a regular starter in Sweden's line-up. As a result of Tobias Linderoth getting injured, he was once again a regular starter at Euro 2008, although the team did not make it into the knockout stages of the competition. Andersson retired from the national team after the unsuccessful campaign to qualify for the 2010 World Cup, in order to devote his energies to Malmö FF.

Coaching career
Andersson was appointed as one of three new assistant managers at Malmö FF along with Jörgen Pettersson and Simon Hollyhead on 29 October 2011. His focus was primarily on the defensive side of training at first and helping former manager Rikard Norling with picking the starting eleven. On 9 January 2014, Andersson assumed the role of director of sports at the club, taking over the position from Per Ågren who was stepping down.

On 14 May 2018, Andersson took over as the caretaker manager at Malmö FF, following the sacking of Magnus Pehrsson; as the club was placed 10th in the league after nine rounds.

Personal life
Daniel Andersson is the son of Roy Andersson and the younger brother of Patrik Andersson, all three of them being some of the most successful players in Malmö FF. A notable fact is also that all three have played centre back and have been team captain of Malmö FF.

Career statistics

Club

International

Honours
Malmö FF
Allsvenskan: 2004, 2010

Individual
Swedish Midfielder of the Year: 1997
Swedish Goal of the Year: 1997

Footnotes

References

External links
 Malmö FF profile 
 

1977 births
Living people
Swedish footballers
Footballers from Skåne County
Sweden international footballers
Sweden under-21 international footballers
UEFA Euro 2000 players
2002 FIFA World Cup players
2006 FIFA World Cup players
UEFA Euro 2008 players
Allsvenskan players
Malmö FF players
Serie A players
S.S.C. Bari players
Venezia F.C. players
A.C. ChievoVerona players
A.C. Ancona players
Swedish expatriate footballers
Swedish expatriate sportspeople in Italy
Expatriate footballers in Italy
Association football defenders
Association football midfielders